Chelimo, also Jelimo, is a surname of Kenyan origin meaning "born in the morning - when cows are going out to pasture" (Chep- + Limo). 

It may refer to:

Chelimo

Elijah Chelimo Kipterege (born 1987), Kenyan steeplechase runner
Nicholas Chelimo (born 1983), Kenyan professional marathon runner
Paul Chelimo (born 1990), Kenyan-born American long-distance track runner
Richard Chelimo (1972–2001), Kenyan long-distance track runner and Olympic medallist
Rose Chelimo (born 1989), Kenyan-born Bahraini long-distance runner and 2017 world champion 

Jelimo

Pamela Jelimo (born 1989), Kenyan middle-distance runner and 2008 Olympic champion

See also

Kiplimo, related name meaning "son of Limo"

Kalenjin names